Ellen's Diary  ( Eleni oragiry) is an Armenian teen drama television series. The series premiered on Shant Premium on September 18, 2017 and airs every workday at 9:00 (PM).

Most of the series took place in Yerevan, Armenia.

Cast and characters

Inna Khojamiryan as Ellen
Marinka Khachatryan as Sara
Sisian Sephanyan as Levon
Davit Aghajanyan as Aram
Mariam Adamyan as Lisa
Edgar Igityan as Max
Mary Yeremyan as Miss Sona

Nelly Kheranyan as Marie Arsenovna
Davit Hakobyan as Gurgen Papi
Hovak Galoyan as Arto Maximovich

References

External links
 

2010s high school television series
Armenian-language television shows
Armenian drama television series
Shant TV original programming
2010s teen drama television series
2017 Armenian television series debuts
2010s Armenian television series